The following is a timeline of the presidency of Donald Trump during the first quarter of 2017, beginning from his inauguration as the 45th president of the United States on January 20, 2017, to March 31, 2017. To navigate between quarters, see timeline of the Donald Trump presidency. For the Q2 timeline see timeline of the Donald Trump presidency (2017 Q2).

Overview

Economy and employment

In the first quarter of 2017, the real U.S. Gross Domestic Product (GDP) increased at an annual rate of 0.7%, the slowest growth since the first quarter of 2014. The growth was primarily caused by an increase in business structures and equipment (such as mining and wells), industrial supplies and materials (like petroleum), and services. This was offset by decreases in motor vehicles and parts, private inventory investment, and government spending. On March 31, 2017, the U.S. national debt stood at $19.8 trillion representing a quarterly decline of 0.65%.

Public opinion

According to FiveThirtyEight, President Trump's approval rate at the end of March was 40.5%, down 5% from the start of his presidency.

Timeline

January 2017

February 2017

March 2017

See also
 Presidential transition of Donald Trump
 First 100 days of Donald Trump's presidency
 List of executive actions by Donald Trump
 List of presidential trips made by Donald Trump (international trips)
 Timeline of the 2016 United States presidential election

References

2017 Q1
2017 Q1
Presidency of Donald Trump
January 2017 events in the United States
February 2017 events in the United States
March 2017 events in the United States
Articles containing video clips